Motoren- und Turbinen-Union GmbH (MTU) is a former German engine manufacturer, now two separate companies:

 MTU Aero Engines, a German aircraft engine manufacturer
 MTU Friedrichshafen, a former division of DaimlerChrysler